The 2021 Gran Canaria Challenger was a professional tennis tournament played on clay courts. It was the first edition of the tournament which was part of the 2021 ATP Challenger Tour. It took place in Las Palmas, Spain between 22 and 28 February 2021.

Singles main-draw entrants

Seeds

1 Rankings as of 15 February 2021.

Other entrants
The following players received wildcards into the singles main draw:
  Javier Barranco Cosano
  Mark Owen Endler
  Carlos Gimeno Valero

The following player received entry into the singles main draw as an alternate:
  Nino Serdarušić

The following players received entry from the qualifying draw:
  Manuel Guinard
  Àlex Martí Pujolràs
  Alex Molčan
  Emilio Nava

Champions

Singles

 Enzo Couacaud def.  Steven Diez 7–6(7–5), 7–6(7–3).

Doubles

 Lloyd Glasspool /  Harri Heliövaara def.  Kimmer Coppejans /  Sergio Martos Gornés 7–5, 6–1.

References

2021 ATP Challenger Tour
2021 in Spanish tennis
February 2021 sports events in Spain